Shiojiri may refer to 
Shiojiri, Nagano, a city in Japan
Shiojiri Station, a railway station in Shiojiri, Nagano
Shiojiri-shuku, a former station in Shiojiri, Nagano
Kazuya Shiojiri (born 1996), Japanese runner